Rhizopogon amylopogon is a sub-genus of Rhizopogon containing seven species.

 R. brunsii
 R. arctostaphyli
 R. kretzerae
 R. salebrosus
 R. pinyonensis
 R. ellenae
 R. subpurpurascens

Sub-genus Amylopogon are ectomycorrhizal fungi categorized as monotropoid mycorrhiza. These fungi are characterized by the presence of a mantle, Hartig net, unique fungal peg, and intracellular hyphal complexes. They are also classified by a specific and obligate symbiosis with members of Monotropoideae through a process known as myco-heterotrophy. Monotropoideae species depend on Amylopogon fungi for carbon which they in turn acquire from members of Pinus in a host specific tripartite Hartig net exchange.

References

Rhizopogonaceae